In Greek mythology, the Heliadae or Heliadai were the seven sons of Helios and Rhodos and grandsons of Poseidon. They were brothers to Electryone.

Biography 
They were Ochimus, Cercaphus, Macareus (or Macar), Actis, Tenages, Triopas, and Candalus (Nonnus adds Auges and Thrinax). They were expert astrologers and seafarers, and were the first to introduce sacrifices to Athena at Rhodes. They also drove the Telchines out of Rhodes.

Mythology 
Tenages was the most highly endowed of the Heliadae, and was eventually killed by Macareus, Candalus, Triopas and Actis. This is attributed to their jealousy of his skills at science. As soon as their crime was discovered, the four had to escape from Rhodes: Macareus fled to Lesbos, Candalus to Cos, Triopas to Caria, and Actis to Egypt. Ochimus and Cercaphus, who stayed aside from the crime, remained at the island and founded the city of Achaea (in the territory of modern Ialysos). Ochimus, the eldest of the brothers, seized control over the island; Cercaphus married Ochimus' daughter and succeeded to the power. The three sons of Cercaphus, Lindus, Ialysus and Camirus, were founders and eponyms of the cities Lindos, Ialysos and Kameiros respectively.

Genealogy

Notes

References

 Diodorus Siculus, Diodorus Siculus: The Library of History. Translated by Charles Henry Oldfather. Twelve volumes. Loeb Classical Library. Cambridge, Massachusetts: Harvard University Press; London: William Heinemann, Ltd. 1989.Online version at the Perseus Digital Library.
 Homer, The Odyssey with an English Translation by A.T. Murray, PH.D. in two volumes. Cambridge, MA., Harvard University Press; London, William Heinemann, Ltd. 1919. . Online version at the Perseus Digital Library. Greek text available from the same website.
 Nonnus of Panopolis, Dionysiaca translated by William Henry Denham Rouse (1863-1950), from the Loeb Classical Library, Cambridge, MA, Harvard University Press, 1940.  Online version at the Topos Text Project.
 Nonnus of Panopolis, Dionysiaca. 3 Vols. W.H.D. Rouse. Cambridge, MA., Harvard University Press; London, William Heinemann, Ltd. 1940-1942. Greek text available at the Perseus Digital Library.
Pindar, Odes translated by Diane Arnson Svarlien. 1990. Online version at the Perseus Digital Library.
Pindar, The Odes of Pindar including the Principal Fragments with an Introduction and an English Translation by Sir John Sandys, Litt.D., FBA. Cambridge, MA., Harvard University Press; London, William Heinemann Ltd. 1937. Greek text available at the Perseus Digital Library.
Smith, William; Dictionary of Greek and Roman Biography and Mythology, London (1873). "Heliadae and Heliads"

Children of Helios
Rhodian mythology
Demigods in classical mythology
Rhodian characters in Greek mythology